{{Infobox animanga/Print
| type            = manga
| author          = Ayumu Kasuga
| publisher       = Houbunsha
| publisher_en    = 
| demographic     = Seinen
| magazine        = Manga Time Kirara Miracle!Comic Fuz (2020 - present)
| first           = June 2012
| last            = 
| volumes         = 6
| volume_list     =
}}

, is a Japanese four-panel comic strip manga series written and illustrated by Ayumu Kasuga. It made its first appearance in Houbunsha's Manga Time Kirara Miracle! magazine with the June 2012 issue. A 12-episode anime television series adaptation animated by Production IMS aired in Japan between July 2 and September 17, 2015.

Plot
The Sakurada family live a normal life in a typical Japanese suburban household. At least that is what their father, who is the king, wants for them. As members of a royal family, each sibling possesses a unique superpower and over 2,000 security cameras have been placed around town to ensure that no harm befalls the siblings. In addition to that, each of the nine Sakurada siblings have been designated as a potential successor to become king or queen, and the only way to do that is through an election.

However, for the timid, soft-spoken and shy Akane Sakurada, who wields the power to control and manipulate gravity, all of this attention is nothing short of a nightmare. With all of the cameras constantly monitoring their activities and even broadcasting them on a television channel specially dedicated to the Sakurada family, she knows that if she becomes queen, then all of the cameras must disappear.

Characters
Sakurada family

Eldest child of the Sakurada family. Her ability is originally said to be , which allows her to do anything once she has learned it. However this is only a front for her true ability, which allows her to order anyone under her bidding but she keeps this as a secret from everyone except her father, as she is afraid of this power and has very little control over it. It is also because of this that she feels she does not deserve to be queen, despite having the highest chance according to the pre-election rankings. In the manga her true ability is revealed as "Brave Believer", which is a power which gives people the push to lay their feelings bare and act on what they want to do but are hesitant to do so.

Second child and eldest son of the Sakurada family. He is the twin of Kanade. He has stated that he is too busy making sure Kanade is not chosen as king to be campaigning for and try to become king himself, despite knowing her agenda to become one. Although not really showing it, Shū has a crush on Hana from his childhood, which makes it a reason why he prefers girls with pigtails. In the past, Shū wanted to become a professional soccer player but Kanade accidentally injured his legs which resulted in his current condition preventing him from joining advanced sports. He is the second member of the Akane Fan Club which makes it easier for him to watch out for her. He greatly adores Kanade as well. He greatly resembles his father when his father was his age.

Third child and second daughter of the Sakurada family. She is the twin of Shū. In order to materialize them, she has to pay the amount of money it takes to use the requested object, which forces her to hold down a job and keep a vast amount of money estimated to be as much as the country's national savings. She is the vice president of the Student Council. Among her siblings, Kanade has the strongest desire to become queen. Because she accidentally injured Shū's legs in the past, Kanade's motive for becoming the queen is to advance the country's medical system in order to cure him and correct her past mistake. She greatly adores Shū.

The main protagonist of the series. Akane is the fourth child and third daughter of the Sakurada family. She hates being the center of attention, due to a childhood trauma and being followed by cameras all day, and as such aims to be king to get rid of the cameras, despite how ironically she would get more attention on herself if she succeeds. She adores her family & friends and likes to rely on Shū. Despite her shyness, she has a strong sense of justice and is her class' representative. She's completely unaware that she has a fan club at school. Once, Aoi and Kanade wanted her to become a more confident person so they give her an alter-ego as a superhero named , basing her on a fictional television superhero, Rose Typhoon. Akane thinks this as a great disguise not knowing that the citizens and the Sakurada siblings were all aware of her true identity and only played along with the charade for her.

Fifth child and fourth daughter of the Sakurada family. She is the twin of Haruka. Since each copy excels in each of their aspects, Misaki gets annoyed that that makes her look bland in comparison as she doesn't excel in anything.

Sixth child and middle son of the Sakurada family. He is the twin of Misaki. He tends to be the straight man in the antics of his siblings. Haruka is one of two Sakuraba siblings (along with Aoi) who do not take interest in the election, as he wants to support Misaki.

10-year-old seventh child and fifth daughter of the Sakurada family. Inspired by Sacchan's performance, Hikari tries to become an idol, under the name , but finds it futile to draw votes for her since she isn't using her real name or age as an idol.

Six-year-old eighth child and youngest son of the Sakurada family. He tends to speak in an old fashioned way and likes to think of himself as a hero.

Five-year-old ninth child and youngest daughter of the Sakurada family. Despite being the youngest of the nine, she's actually thoughtful and observant.

Sōichirō is the father of the nine Sakurada children and the king. He cares for his family so much that he secretly hires a SAT team whenever his children are alone at home. His parents died when he was younger, and as a result he became king in his first year of high school. His royal ability allows him to read people's emotions through their aura.

Satsuki is the mother of the nine Sakurada children and the queen. She comes from a family of five siblings, and was Sōichirō's first friend as she was the only person willing to interact with him despite knowing his royalty.

The Sakurada family's pet cat, it was first picked and adopted by Hikari. Borscht likes to chew plastic bags than cat food after claiming that even the taste of a royal cooking "loses" to a plastic bag. He also likes Akane and always sleeps on her chest as it feels like his old shelter, much to Hikari's dismay, since she thinks of herself as his true owner.

Others

Hana is Shū's classmate from elementary school who moved out from the town. After she returns, she falls in love with Shū and confesses her feelings. Though Shū has been in love with Hana since they were children, he decides to put their relationship on hold since he wants to focus on the election. Eventually, the two become lovers and Hana often helps Shū in his election campaign.

Karen is Akane's classmate and childhood friend, always helping her whenever she is in trouble. She also has a crush on Akane.

Fukushina is Akane's classmate and secretly the president of the Akane Fan Club. He likes Akane's face when she is embarrassed.

An is Akane's classmate. In the anime, she only made her appearance during the first and the last episodes and alongside Karen wishing their classmates to vote for Akane.

Nicknamed , she is an idol under the talent management Geinou Productions. Her career is the inspiration behind Hikari's alter ego as Light Sakuraba, much to her dismay. She initially sees Hikari/Light as a great rival and doesn't understand the true efforts as an idol, often giving her a bad treatment until she sprained her ankle during a live stage, causing her to realise her mistake. According to the manga's writer, Ayumu Kasuga, Sachiko was purposely designed and named after the voice actress herself.

Uzuki is one of Aoi's childhood friends, and the student council president of Sakuraka Academy.

Media
MangaCastle Town Dandelion is a four-panel comic strip manga written and illustrated by Ayumu Kasuga. It made its first appearance in the June 2012 issue of Houbunsha's Manga Time Kirara Miracle! magazine, and began serialization in the magazine with the August 2012 issue. Houbunsha published the first tankōbon'' volume on March 27, 2013, and six volumes have been released as of November 26, 2021. A manga anthology illustrated by various artists titled  was released on August 27, 2015.

Anime
The series was adapted into a 12-episode anime television series, directed by Noriaki Akitaya and animated at Production IMS. The series was written by Reiko Yoshida, and Shinpei Kobayashi served as character designer and animation director. The opening theme is "Ring Ring Rainbow!!" by YuiKaori (Yui Ogura and Kaori Ishihara), and the ending theme is "Honey♥Come!!" by Yui Ogura. The series premiered in Japan on July 2, 2015 on TBS and CBC, on Sun TV on July 3, and on BS-TBS on July 11. The series is licensed by Funimation (now known as Crunchyroll) in North America and is simulcast in its streaming service and in the United Kingdom and Ireland by Anime Limited and Viewster.

Notes

References

External links
Anime official website 

2012 manga
Comedy anime and manga
Funimation
Houbunsha manga
Production IMS
School life in anime and manga
Seinen manga
Supernatural anime and manga
Works about elections
Yonkoma